Sorkvareh Owlad Qobad (also Romanized as Sorkvareh Owlād Qobād; also known as Sorkvareh Nūrkhodā) is a village in Kuhdasht-e Shomali Rural District, in the Central District of Kuhdasht County, Lorestan Province, Iran. At the 2006 census, its population was 255, in 48 families.

References 

Towns and villages in Kuhdasht County